Khadgam  is a 2002 Indian Telugu-language action drama film directed by Krishna Vamsi and produced by Sunkara Madhu Murali under Karthikeya Movies. It features Srikanth, Ravi Teja, Prakash Raj, Sonali Bendre, Sangeetha Krish and Kim Sharma in the prominent roles with music composed by Devi Sri Prasad.

Released on 29 November 2002, the film was successful. The film won five Nandi Awards and three Filmfare Awards. The film is remade in Hindi as Insan (2005).

Plot
Koti (Ravi Teja) is an aspiring film actor. He wants to be called Babu. Amjad (Prakash Raj) is a driver as well as a devout Muslim and is equally patriotic about India. His younger brother Azhar has been missing for the past year.

The cops of Hyderabad arrest an ISI terrorist Masood. In a bid to get him released, Pakistani authorities train Azhar and send him to Hyderabad to incite riots and create communal tension. Azhar returns to Hyderabad and stays with his brother Amjad. His clandestine activities include devising and executing a plan to release Masood.

Radha Krishna (Srikanth) is a sincere and efficient police officer. He hates Pakistan for personal reasons. It is later revealed in a flashback that Radha Krishna's love Swathy (Sonali Bendre) was killed by ISI forces. The rest of the story revolved around how these three protagonists prevent terrorist Masood from fleeing to Pakistan.

Cast

Awards

Soundtrack
The soundtrack of the movie was composed by Devi Sri Prasad and lyrics were written by Sirivennela Sitaramasastri, Suddala Ashok Teja and Shakti. The concept behind the song "Govinda Govinda" is based on Adnan Sami's "Lift Karade".

Release
The film was dubbed into Hindi as Marte Dam Tak, into Tamil as Manik Baasha and into Bhojpuri as Bemisaal Hai Hum.

References

External links
 

2002 films
Telugu films remade in other languages
Films directed by Krishna Vamsi
2000s Telugu-language films
Indian action drama films
Films set in Hyderabad, India
Films shot in Hyderabad, India
Films about terrorism in India
Films about jihadism
Films scored by Devi Sri Prasad
Films about religious violence in India
Films about religion
2002 action drama films